The 2019–20 B.League season was the fourth season of the Japanese B.League. The 2020 B. League All-Star Game was played on January 18, 2020 at the Hokkai Kitayell in Sapporo, Hokkaido. At the end of February 2020, the B.League temporarily suspended its competitions for two weeks until March 13, 2020 due to the COVID-19 pandemic. However, on March 27, 2020, the B.League canceled the remainder of the season.

B1

Regular season 
The regular season began on October 3, 2019 and originally scheduled to end on April 19, 2020.

East District

Central District

West District

B1 Individual statistic leaders

B2

Regular season 
The regular season began on September 20, 2019.

East District

Central District

West District

B2 Individual statistic leaders

B3 season

B3 regular season

B3 Individual statistic leaders

References 

2019–20 in Asian basketball leagues
B.League
B.League seasons
B.League season